The Connecticut Valley Railroad Roundhouse and Turntable Site is a former railroad facility located in Fort Saybrook Monument Park off Main Street in Old Saybrook, Connecticut. The roundhouse and turntable were built in 1871 by the Connecticut Valley Railroad, which was later acquired by the New York, New Haven and Hartford Railroad. The rail facilities are built partly on the archaeological remains of Fort Saybrook, the main fortification of the 17th-century Saybrook Colony, and are the only surviving remnant of what was once a large facility, with an icehouse, coal bin, steamboat dock, depot, and signal tower.   Archaeological remains of these other facilities are believed to lie under other parts of the park and adjacent properties.  The exposed facilities were excavated in 1981-2.  Both structures were added to the National Register of Historic Places on April 28, 1994.

The Connecticut Valley Railroad was chartered in 1868, and began operations three years later, providing service between Saybrook Point and Hartford, with a connection to the Shore Line Railway at the Saybrook Junction station.  The extension to Saybrook Point ceased operations in 1922, and its facilities were abandoned.  The roundhouse was a quarter-round structure housing six bays, with foundations of brick and stone, supporting both the structure and the tracks on which the railroad cars ran.  The turntable had a concrete base.  Portions of these features are exposed in the park, with interpretive signage explaining the use and history of the site.

See also
National Register of Historic Places listings in Middlesex County, Connecticut

References

Transportation buildings and structures in Middlesex County, Connecticut
Industrial buildings and structures on the National Register of Historic Places in Connecticut
National Register of Historic Places in Middlesex County, Connecticut
Stations along New York, New Haven and Hartford Railroad lines
Railroad roundhouses in Connecticut
Railway turntables
Transport infrastructure completed in 1871
Railway roundhouses on the National Register of Historic Places
Railway buildings and structures on the National Register of Historic Places in Connecticut
Old Saybrook, Connecticut